Pardon My French is a lost 1921 American silent comedy film produced by Messmore Kendall and distributed by Goldwyn Pictures. It was directed by Sidney Olcott with Vivian Martin in the leading role.

Plot
As described in a film magazine, Polly (Martin), an ingenue with a barnstorming acting troupe, works her way back to New York City with the rest of the company on a coal barge. Bunny (Spink), who has always played butler roles, secures a position with the Hawkers, a newly rich Kansas family on Long Island, and when they are in need of a French maid secures the position for Polly. A bogus Count and Countess attempt to win the confidence of the Hawkers, but their son Zeke (Yearsley) prefers the company of Polly to that of Countess Castairs (Studiford). Mrs. Hawker (Beresford) gives a party and Polly is dressed up to act as one of the guests. After she is insulted, she leaves the house. The family jewels are stolen and Polly is arrested. She unwittingly tips off the police to the bogus count and countess and is freed. Having fallen in love with a wealthy ex-actor, Ferdinand Aloysius MacGillicudy, she agrees to become his leading lady for life.

Cast
Vivian Martin as Polly
George Spink as Bunny
Thomas Meegan as J. Hawker
Nadine Beresford as Mrs. Hawker
Ralph Yearsley as Zeke Hawker
Grace Studiford as Countess Castairs
Walter McEwen as Marquis de Void
Wallace Ray as Ferdinand Aloysius MacGillicudy

References

External links

 Pardon My French website dedicated to Sidney Olcott

1921 films
American silent feature films
Films directed by Sidney Olcott
1921 comedy films
Silent American comedy films
American black-and-white films
Lost American films
1921 lost films
Lost comedy films
1920s American films